Carrie Southworth is an American actress, model, and businesswoman who portrayed Dr. Claire Simpson on the SOAPnet prime time serial General Hospital: Night Shift in 2008. She is also the co-founder of a personalized children's book company launched in 2011.

Early life and education
Southworth grew up in Northern Virginia and graduated from the Madeira School in 1995. Southworth spent four years of her childhood living in Dar es Salaam, Tanzania, where her father was posted with the World Bank. She went on to major in chemistry and sciences at the University of Virginia, but later switched her major to economics. She started modeling for Elite Model Management at age 17. In a 2008 interview, Southworth noted, "After I graduated with my economics degree, I had a choice between modeling and working on the bond trading floor at Chase Manhattan Bank. The bank was boring, so I went back to modeling. That led to acting, and here I am!"

Career 
In 2008 Southworth landed the contract role of new medical intern Dr. Claire Simpson in the second season of General Hospital: Night Shift, a prime time spin-off of the ABC Daytime soap opera General Hospital. The 13-episode limited series aired from July 22, 2008 to October 14, 2008. Southworth's character also headlined an online series of webisodes called Night Shift: Claire & Kyle, with her Night Shift co-star Adam Grimes in his role of Dr. Kyle Julian. The actress had also appeared on General Hospital itself for three episodes in 2006 in the role of Dr. Gwen Miller, a minor love interest for one of the later contract roles on Night Shift, Jason Thompson's Dr. Patrick Drake.

Southworth has also guest-starred on several television series, including the 2003 Buffy the Vampire Slayer episode "Dirty Girls," Las Vegas (2004/2005), CSI: Miami (2006), Pepper Dennis (2006), Justice (2006) and Rules of Engagement (2007). She appeared in the films The Look (2003), Phat Girlz (2006) and These Days (2006).

In 2011, Southworth cofounded TwigTale, a company which makes customized story books focused on child development that include customer photos and personalized elements.

Personal life
In 2005 Southworth married Collister "Coddy" Johnson III, son of Collister "Terry" Johnson Jr., a lawyer and former administrator of the St. Lawrence Seaway Development Corporation. Coddy's godfather is the former U.S. President George W. Bush, who had been the roommate of the elder Johnson at Yale University.

Southworth's younger sister, Lucy, is the wife of Google co-founder Larry Page.

Southworth's father is Van Roy Southworth, who retired from the World Bank after assignments in Tanzania, Croatia, and the Republic of Georgia.

Filmography

Film

Television

References

External links
 
 

American female models
American film actresses
American soap opera actresses
Living people
Year of birth missing (living people)
University of Virginia alumni
21st-century American women